The William B. Umstead Bridge is a two-lane automobile bridge spanning the Croatan Sound, between Manns Harbor and Roanoke Island, in Dare County, North Carolina. The bridge carries US 64 and is utilized by local and seasonal tourist traffic.

The bridge is dedicated to William B. Umstead, who was a member of the U.S. House of Representatives, a U.S. Senator and the 63rd  Governor of North Carolina.

History
Plans for a bridge to connect the North Carolina mainland with Roanoke Island started in the 1920s, when local developers wanted to make the Outer Banks a tourist destination.  However, because of the high cost, the State Highway Commission focused their funds on improving the primary highway system.  As a result, the local businessmen took matters into their own hands and formed private toll-bridge companies; building Roanoke Sound Bridge in 1928 and the Wright Memorial Bridge in 1930.  By around 1940, free ferry service was available between Manns Harbor and Manteo.

By the 1950s, the Outer Banks eventually became a tourist destination and the State Highway Commission began taking an increasingly active role in the area.  In 1955 Dare County Bridge 9 was built by T. A. Loving Company of Goldsboro, NC and was dedicated to William B. Umstead on April 25 1957.  In 1966, the bridge was rehabilitated.

In 2002, the bridge was bypassed by a larger, more modern bridge, the Virginia Dare Memorial Bridge to the south, which provides a more direct access to Bodie Island by connecting directly to the Washington Baum Bridge between Roanoke and Bodie Islands; traffic using the Virginia Dare Bridge no longer needs to go through Manteo to reach the Outer Banks.

The two-lane bridge initially carried US 64 and US 264; in September 2003, US 264 was removed.

Purple martins have used beams under the bridge as a roost during July and August since it opened, and many have died when drivers crossed the bridge during the times of the birds' greatest activity. In 2007, the  Coastal Carolina Purple Martin Society asked that the bridge's speed limit be reduced from 55 MPH to 20 MPH at dawn and dusk when the birds are swarming. Making the change has significantly reduced the number of bird deaths.

See also
 
 
 
 North Carolina Bicycle Route 2

References

Buildings and structures in Dare County, North Carolina
Bridges completed in 1955
Road bridges in North Carolina
U.S. Route 64
Bridges of the United States Numbered Highway System
Steel bridges in the United States
1955 establishments in North Carolina